Richard Charles Humphrey is the current dean of Hobart in Tasmania, Australia.

Humphrey was born in London, and was educated at The Friends' School, Hobart, the University of Sydney, Moorlands Bible College, and Moore Theological College.

External links
Anglican Dean of Hobart Richard Humphrey shares his love of 'Satanic' prog rock, 2016-02-01, ABC News website

References

Deans of Hobart
Living people
Year of birth missing (living people)
Anglican clergy from London
University of Sydney alumni
Moore Theological College alumni